Weak Spot is a 1975 French-Italian-German thriller film directed by Peter Fleischmann. It is based on a novel by Antonis Samarakis.

Cast

Michel Piccoli: Michel
Ugo Tognazzi: Ugo
Mario Adorf:  Manager 
Adriana Asti:   Ugo's Girlfriend
Dimos Starenios:  	Police superintendent
Thymios Karakatsanis: Hairdresser

References

External links

1970s political thriller films
Italian political thriller films
French political thriller films
German political thriller films
West German films
Films directed by Peter Fleischmann
Films scored by Ennio Morricone
Films based on Greek novels
1970s Italian films
1970s French films
1970s German films